The Team sprint large hill/2 × 7,5 km competition at the FIS Nordic World Ski Championships 2019 was held on 24 February 2019.

Results

Ski jumping
The ski jumping part was started at 10:30.

Cross-country skiing
The cross-country skiing part was started at 13:30.

References

Team sprint large hill 2 x 7,5 km